Dan Jolley is an American novelist and comic book writer. His comics work includes DC Comics' Firestorm and Graphic Universe's Twisted Journeys, a series of interactive fiction or gamebooks in graphic novel form, and his novel work includes the young-adult science fiction espionage series Alex Unlimited along with his international best selling novel, The Gray Widow's Walk, which is his first book in the Gray Widow trilogy that he publishes through Seventh Star Press.

Career
Dan Jolley began his writing career in the early nineties. His limited series Obergeist was voted Best Horror Comic of 2001 by Wizard magazine, and his DC Comics project JSA: The Unholy Three received an Eisner Award nomination for Best Limited Series of 2003.

His other comics include Bloodhound, a series about an investigator following a super-powered serial killer in the DC Universe.

May 2007 saw the debut of his first novel series, an original young-adult science fiction espionage story called Alex Unlimited, published by a joint venture of Tokyopop and HarperCollins.

He wrote many manga novels for the Warriors series by Erin Hunter, including The Lost Warrior, Warrior's Refuge, Warrior's Return (the previous three all belonging to the Graystripe's Adventure trilogy) The Rise of Scourge, Into the Woods, Escape from the Forest, Return to the Clans (the previous three all belonging to the Sasha and Tigerstar trilogy), Shattered Peace, A Clan in Need, The Heart of a Warrior (the previous three belonging to the Ravenpaw's Path trilogy), The Rescue, Beyond the Code, After the Flood (the previous three belonging to the SkyClan and the Stranger trilogy), A Shadow in RiverClan, Winds of Change, Exile from ShadowClan, and A Thief in ThunderClan.

He also wrote the teen novelization of the 2008 motion picture Iron Man.

Jolley was on the design team of Icarus Studios' post-apocalyptic MMORPG, Fallen Earth. He writes for video games from Activision and Ubisoft.

Works

Novels 
Gray Widow's War: The Gray Widow Trilogy Book 3, Falstaff Books, Charlotte, NC, October 2020
Gray Widow's Web: The Gray Widow Trilogy Book 2, Falstaff Books, Charlotte, NC, October 2020
The Storm, Falstaff Books, Charlotte, NC, September 2020
Five Elements Book 3: The Crimson Serpent, HarperCollins, New York, April 2018
Five Elements Book 2: The Shadow City, HarperCollins, New York, July 2017
Five Elements Book 1: The Emerald Tablet, HarperCollins, New York, October 2016
Gray Widow's Walk, Seventh Star Press, Lexington, May 2016
Transformers 2 Junior Novel (motion picture novelization), HarperCollins, New York, May 2009
Alex Unlimited Book 3: True Chemistry, Tokyopop/HarperCollins, New York, April 2008
Iron Man Teen Novelization (motion picture novelization), HarperCollins, New York, March 2008
Alex Unlimited Book 2: Split-Second Sight, Tokyopop/HarperCollins, New York, September 2007
Alex Unlimited Book 1: The Vosarak Code, Tokyopop/HarperCollins, New York, May 2007
Angel: Vengeance, Simon & Schuster, New York, August 2002 (co-written with Scott Ciencin)
Star Trek SCE: Some Assembly Required, Pocket Books, New York, January 2002 (co-written with Scott Ciencin)

Video Games 
Chronos (Oculus Rift), Gunfire Games, March 2016
Mafia 3 (Xbox One, PS4, PC), 2K Games/Hangar 13, 2016
Dying Light (Xbox One, PS4, PC), Warner Bros./Techland, January 2015
The Bureau: XCOM Declassified (Xbox 360, PS3, PC), 2K Games, August 2013
Transformers Prime: The Game (Wii, Wii U, Nintendo 3DS), Activision/Nowpro, October 2012
Transformers: Fall of Cybertron (Xbox 360, PS3, PC), Activision/High Moon Studios, August 2012
Prototype 2 (Xbox 360, PS3), Activision/Radical Entertainment, April 2012 
Transformers: Dark of the Moon (Xbox 360, PS3, Wii), Activision/High Moon Studios/Behavior Interactive, July 2011
Transformers: War for Cybertron (Xbox 360, PS3, PC), Activision/High Moon Studios, June 2010
Transformers: Cybertron Adventures (Wii), Activision/Next Level Games, June 2010
James Cameron's Avatar (Nintendo DS), Ubisoft Montreal, December 2009
Fallen Earth (PC), Icarus Studios, September 2009

Comics

 Warriors: A Thief in ThunderClan, HarperCollins, June 2023
 Warriors: Exile from ShadowClan, HarperCollins, June 2022
 Warriors: Winds of Change, HarperCollins, June 2021

 Warriors: A Shadow in RiverClan, HarperCollins, June 2020

LARP!, three 80-page graphic novels, Dark Horse Comics, Portland, May 2015
The Savage Sword of Robert E. Howard: The Maid of Winter's Night, short story, Dark Horse Comics, Portland, July 2014
Terminator: Enemy of My Enemy, six-issue mini-series, Dark Horse Comics, Portland, February 2014
Eerie: Invulnerable, short story, Dark Horse Comics, Portland, February 2014
Bloodhound: Crowbar Medicine, five-issue mini-series, Dark Horse Comics, Portland, October 2013
Wrapped Up in You (My Boyfriend is a Monster #10), Lerner Books, Minneapolis, May 2012
Warriors: SkyClan and the Stranger: After the Flood, HarperCollins, April 2012
Warriors: SkyClan and the Stranger: Beyond the Code, HarperCollins, November 2011
Warriors: SkyClan and the Stranger: The Rescue, HarperCollins, July 2011
Warriors: Ravenpaw's Path: The Heart of a Warrior, HarperCollins, Tokyopop, August 2010
Warriors: Ravenpaw's Path: A Clan in Need, HarperCollins, Tokyopop, March 2010
Warriors: Ravenpaw's Path: Shattered Peace, HarperCollins, Tokyopop, November 2009
My Boyfriend Bites (My Boyfriend is a Monster #3), Lerner Books, Minneapolis, July 2011
Warcraft: Death Knight, Tokyopop, Los Angeles, November 2009
Warcraft Legends: Bloodsail Buccaneer, short story, Tokyopop, Los Angeles, June 2009
Warriors: Return to the Clans, HarperCollins, Tokyopop, June 2009
Warcraft Legends: Crusader's Blood, short story, Tokyopop, Los Angeles, March 2009
Warriors: Escape from the Forest, HarperCollins, Tokyopop, December 2008
Warcraft Legends: Miles to Go, short story, Tokyopop, Los Angeles, November 2008
Warriors: Into the Woods, HarperCollins, Tokyopop, September 2008
Warcraft Legends: How to Win Friends, short story, Tokyopop, Los Angeles, August 2008
Warriors: The Rise of Scourge, HarperCollins, Tokyopop, June 2008
Warriors: Graystripe's Adventure: Warrior's Return, HarperCollins, Tokyopop, 2008
Warriors: Graystripe' Adventure: Warrior's Refuge, HarperCollins, Tokyopop, 2007
Warriors: Graystripe's Adventure: The Lost Warrior, HarperCollins, Tokyopop, 2007
Angel: Choice Cuts, one issue in five-issue mini-series, IDW Studios, San Diego, 2006
Hell, Michigan, four-issue mini-series, FC9 Publishing, Morristown, 2005
G.I. Joe Vs. The Transformers II, four-issue mini-series, Devil's Due/Image Comics, Chicago, 2005
G.I. Joe Vs. The Transformers I, two issues in five-issue mini-series, Devil's Due/Image Comics, Chicago, 2004
Bloodhound #1-10 (with Leonard Kirk), DC Comics, 2004–2005
Firestorm, DC Comics, 2004–2005Micronauts, 3-issue mini-series, Devil's Due, 2004
Vampirella: The Choir in the Mist, one issue, Harris Comics, New York, 2004
Metal Hurlant: Worship Service, short story, Humanoids Comics, Los Angeles, 2004
Voltron, Devil's Due/Image Comics, Chicago, 2003-2004
G.I. Joe Frontline: Icebound, four-issue mini-series, Devil's Due/Image Comics, Chicago, 2003
Micronauts, Devil's Due/Image Comics, Chicago, 2003-2004
JSA: The Unholy Three, DC Comics, 2003
Superman Adventures, three issues, DC Comics, New York, 2002
Sabretooth: Mary Shelley Overdrive, 4-issue mini-series, Marvel Comics, 2002
Purgatori, Chaos! Comics, 2002-2012
Obergeist, Top Cow Productions, 2001–2002)
JLA: Gods and Monsters (with Josh Krach), DC Comics, 2001
Lazarus 5, DC Comics, 2000
JSA: The Liberty Files, DC Comics, 2000
Doctor Strange: The Flight of Bones, 4-issue mini-series, Marvel Knights, 1999
Aliens: Colonial Marines, two issues in ten-issue mini-series, Dark Horse Comics,  Milwaukie, 1993
Universal Monsters: The Mummy, one-shot special, Dark Horse Comics, Milwaukie, 1992

Educational Comics
Twisted Journeys: Shipwrecked on Mad Island, Lerner Books, Minneapolis, August, 2009
Graphic Universe: Hero Twins: Against the Lords of Death (A Mayan Tale), Lerner Books,  Minneapolis, March 2009
Graphic Universe: Guan Yu: Blood Brothers to the End (A Chinese Tale), Lerner Books, Minneapolis, March 2009
Twisted Journeys: Agent Mongoose & the Hypno-Beam Scheme, Lerner Books,  Minneapolis, February 2009
Graphic Universe: Pigling: A Cinderella Story (A Korean Tale), Lerner Books,  Minneapolis, November 2008
Twisted Journeys: Vampire Hunt, Lerner Books, Minneapolis, September 2008
Twisted Journeys: Alien Incident on Planet J, Lerner Books, Minneapolis, September 2008
Twisted Journeys: The Time Travel Trap, Lerner Books, Minneapolis, February 2008
Graphic Universe: The Smoking Mountain: The Story of Popocatepetl & Iztaccihuatl (An Aztec Tale), Lerner Books, Minneapolis, January 2008
Twisted Journeys: Escape From Pyramid X, Lerner Books, Minneapolis, July 2007
Graphic Universe: Odysseus: Escaping Poseidon's Curse, Lerner Books,  Minneapolis, June 2007

Awards 
Best Horror Story of 2001, Wizard Magazine Awards, for Obergeist
Nominated for Best Mini-series of 2003, Eisner Awards, for JSA: The Unholy Three

References

Other sources

External links

 
Dan Jolley at the Open Library
Interview of Jolley and Scott Ciencin by BBC Cult (bbc.co.uk/cult)
 

Year of birth missing (living people)
21st-century American novelists
Warriors (novel series)
American comics writers
American male novelists
Living people
Place of birth missing (living people)
21st-century American male writers